The Atlas Car and Manufacturing Company was a manufacturer of small railroad locomotives.  The company was based in Cleveland, OH, building equipment from 1896 through the 1980s.

Overview
Atlas specialized in the building of small locomotives and purpose built rail borne equipment for industrial use.  The equipment it manufactured seldom ran on the rails of Class I railroads, but were often used to shuttle freight cars around inside manufacturing plants.  Atlas's products ranged from small 2-ton end cab switchers up to 65-ton center cab switchers.  They also built a wide variety of equipment for the steel industry including blast furnace transfer cars, scale cars, coke quench cars, coke quench locomotives (to 75 tons), furnace cars and self-propelled flatcars. While most equipment was built for steel and coke plants within the United States, some equipment was shipped outside the country (for example 5 scale cars to Russia).

References
 Reed, Jay, Critters, Dinkys & Centercabs

External links

Photos of several Atlas locomotives
Jay Reed publishing

Industrial buildings and structures in Ohio
Defunct locomotive manufacturers of the United States